Eucosma striatiradix is a species of moth of the family Tortricidae. It is found in China (Jilin), Korea, Japan and Russia.

References

Moths described in 1964
Eucosmini